Ainsdale railway station serves the village of Ainsdale near Southport, England. The station is located on the Southport branch of the Merseyrail network's Northern Line.

History
Ainsdale railway station opened in 1848 as an intermediate station on the Liverpool, Crosby and Southport Railway. On 14 June 1855 it became part of the Lancashire and Yorkshire Railway (LYR), which took over from the LCSR. The Lancashire and Yorkshire Railway amalgamated with the London and North Western Railway on 1 January 1922 and in turn was Grouped into the London, Midland and Scottish Railway in 1923. Nationalisation followed in 1948 and in 1978 the station became part of the Merseyrail network's Northern Line (operated by British Rail until privatised in 1995).

Facilities

A new toilet building located on the Southport-bound platform was completed in May 2007. Access is by request at the ticket office.

There is a car parking for 56 vehicles, cycle racks for 6 bikes and a secure cycle storage for a further 32 bikes.

In early June 2014 it was announced that the station would be among a small number of stations across the Merseyrail network that would undergo a £3.7m programme of improvements. The improvement plans for the station were revealed at a public meeting at the village church on 20 July 2015, and it includes new waiting rooms and a new ticket office on the Southport Platform, as well as better access to the platforms and car park and a refurbished Footbridge. Work on the scheme started in May 2017. The new Ticket Office and waiting shelter opened on 2 May 2018 and the platform refurbishment is due to be completed in due course. The station has mounted on its external wall a John Agar (Bury) clock face, the internal workings of which converted from pendulum to electric drive some time ago. The clock face, badly faded by a century of sun, was restored to 'as new' condition and transferred to the new station building to continue the link with a clock maker who supplied clocks to many stations along the line and across the wider north of England network.

Services
Trains operate every 15 minutes throughout the day from Monday to Saturday and on summer Sundays to Southport to the north, and to Hunts Cross via Liverpool Central to the south. Winter Sunday services are every 30 minutes in each direction.

Gallery

References

 
 
 
 
 Station on navigable O.S. map

External links

Railway stations in the Metropolitan Borough of Sefton
DfT Category E stations
Former Lancashire and Yorkshire Railway stations
Railway stations served by Merseyrail
Railway stations in Great Britain opened in 1848